The Bridgeport Brass Company is a former company located in Bridgeport, Connecticut that spun the wire for the first telephone line which ran from New York City to Boston.

History 
In January 1985, the company's employees signed an agreement to buyout the company from its owners to prevent its closure. By this point, the mill was 107 years old and in dire need of repairs and improvements.

References

Companies based in Bridgeport, Connecticut